is a railway station on the San'in Main Line in Gōtsu, Shimane Prefecture, Japan operated by West Japan Railway Company (JR West).

Lines
Gōtsu Station is served by the San'in Main Line, lying 453.4 km from the starting point of the line at Kyoto Station. This was the terminal station for the Sankō Line before it ceased operation on 31 March 2018. The Sankō Line was replaced by a bus service starting 1 April 2018.

Layout 
Gōtsu Station has one side platform and one island platform. The side platform (track 1) is in front of the station office. The island platform is connected to platform 1 by a footbridge.

Platforms

Adjacent stations

History
The station opened on 25 December 1920, originally named . It was renamed simply Gōtsu Station on 1 June 1970.

With the privatization of Japanese National Railways (JNR) on 1 April 1987, the station came under the control of JR West.

On 16 October 2015, JR West announced that it was considering closing the Sanko Line due to poor patronage. On 29 September 2016, JR West announced that the entire line would close on 31 March 2018.

Surrounding area

See also
 List of railway stations in Japan

References

External links

  

Stations of West Japan Railway Company
Railway stations in Japan opened in 1920
Railway stations in Shimane Prefecture